Ryan Walsh (born 18 May 1986) is a British professional boxer. He has held the British featherweight title since 2015, having previously held the English super-bantamweight title in 2011, and has challenged once for the European featherweight title in 2016.

Personal life 
Ryan's twin brother Liam and older brother Michael are also professional boxers, and in 2015 Ryan and Liam became the first twins to hold British titles at the same time.

Professional career
Raised in Rochdale and based in Cromer, Norfolk, Walsh made his professional debut on 2 February 2008 with a first-round knockout of Riaz Durgahed. By April 2011 he had won his first twelve fights, and on 21 October scored a unanimous decision (UD) over Liam Richards to win the English super-bantamweight title.

In October 2013, Walsh challenged Lee Selby for the British and Commonwealth featherweight titles. The fight went the full twelve-round distance, with Selby winning a clear UD to hand Walsh his first loss. Two years later, on 26 September 2015, Walsh faced Samir Mouneimne for the now-vacant British featherweight title. The fight went the distance, with Walsh scoring a split decision to become British champion.

Walsh was set to make his first defence of the title in January 2016 against Ryan Doyle, but instead faced the undefeated Darren Traynor, stopping the challenger in five rounds.

On 28 June 2019, Walsh defended his British featherweight belt against Lewis Paulin. The fight was considered a significant step up in quality for Paulin. Walsh was the better man for most of the fight, although Paulin had a couple of rounds where he boxed well and took the fight to Walsh. In the end, two judges scored the fight in favor of Walsh, 117-111 and 115-114, while the third judge gave the fight 115-113 to Paulin, thus awarding the split-decision victory to Walsh to retain his British featherweight belt.

In his next fight, Walsh fought Harion Socarras as a part of the quarter-final of The Golden Contract featherweight tournament. After a close start, a brawl started in the fifth round, in which Walsh managed to score a knockdown over Socarras. In the ninth round, Walsh sent Socarras to the ropes with a flurry of shots, which prompted the referee to stop the fight.

In the semi-final, Walsh faced Tyrone McCullagh. McCullagh started the fight strong, and was winning for the first half of the fight. However, Walsh managed to drop McCullagh twice in the remainder of the fight, even coming close to stopping him in the ninth. McCullagh made it to the final bell, but Walsh was announced the winner via unanimous decision, earning him a ticket to The Golden Contract tournament final.

Professional boxing record

References

External links

 at BoxNation
Ryan Walsh - Profile, News Archive & Current Rankings at Box.Live

1986 births
Living people
English male boxers
Super-bantamweight boxers
Featherweight boxers
Sportspeople from Rochdale
British Boxing Board of Control champions